Anarnatula is a genus of snout moths. It was described by Harrison Gray Dyar Jr. in 1918.

Species
Anarnatula subflavida (Dyar, 1914)
Anarnatula sylea (Druce, 1899)

References

Epipaschiinae
Pyralidae genera